Number nine may refer to:

 9 (number), natural number
 Number Nine, Arkansas, a community in the United States
 Number Nine (novel), a 1951 novel by A.P. Herbert
 Number Nine (album), by Chris Hülsbeck
 , by Wende (2009)
 Number 9 Audio Group, a recording studio located in Toronto, Ontario, Canada
 Number Nine Visual Technology, a computer hardware manufacturer whose primary business was video cards
 New Mexico No. 9, or No. 9, a chile pepper cultivar
 #9, the flagship beer of Magic Hat Brewing Company
 Number nine, repeated phrase on the Beatles recorded composition "Revolution 9"
 "Number 9", a song by Korean Girl Group T-ara on their EP Again
 Number (N)ine, a Japanese fashion brand found in Tokyo in 1996
 Number Nine, assistant to Jenny Jump in the Oz books by John R. Neill
 Number 9, the shirt number often worn by an association football team's centre forward
 Gordie Howe (1928-2016), Detroit Red Wings hockey player, frequently referred to by his sweater number, number 9
 Bobby Hull (born 1939), Chicago Black Hawks hockey player, frequently referred to by his sweater number, number 9
 Maurice Richard (1921-2000), Canadiens hockey player, frequently referred to by his sweater number, number 9
False 9 or False Number 9, a term used to describe an unconventional association football lone striker or centre-forward, who drops deep into midfield

See also
 9 (disambiguation)